Raja Mansingh Tomar Music & Arts University is a state university located at Gwalior, Madhya Pradesh, India. It was established in 2008 by the Government of Madhya Pradesh and is named after Maharaja Mansingh Tomar. The university offers courses in music, dance, fine arts and drama & theater. It has 170 affiliated colleges.

References

External links

Music schools in India
Art schools in India
Dance schools in India
Universities in Madhya Pradesh
Universities and colleges in Gwalior
Educational institutions established in 2008
2008 establishments in Madhya Pradesh